Anvil Crag is a rock crag rising to   west-southwest of Sphinx Hill, King George Island. The vertical crag is at the head of a medial moraine. It was descriptively named by the UK Antarctic Place-Names Committee in 1977; with its three rock faces and flat top, it has the appearance of an anvil.

References 

Cliffs of Antarctica